Chlorocyathus  is a genus of plants in the Apocynaceae, first described in 1887. It is native to southern Africa.

Species
 Chlorocyathus lobulata (Venter & R.L.Verh.) Venter - Bathurst District in Cape Province of South Africa
 Chlorocyathus monteiroae Oliv. - Maputo Bay (formerly Delagoa Bay) in southern Mozambique

formerly included
moved to Raphionacme 
Chlorocyathus welwitschii (Schltr. & Rendle) Bullock, synonym of Raphionacme welwitschii Schltr. & Rendle

References

Asclepiadoideae
Apocynaceae genera
Taxa named by Daniel Oliver